CMBT Metro, officially known as Puratchi Thalaivi Dr. J. Jayalalithaa CMBT Metro, is an elevated metro station on the Line 2 of the Chennai Metro, which is currently under operation. The station is among the elevated stations coming up along corridor II of the Chennai Metro, Chennai Central – St. Thomas Mount stretch. The station will chiefly serve the Chennai Mofussil Bus Terminus. On 31 July 2020, It has been named by Government of Tamil Nadu as Puratchi Thalaivi Dr. J. Jayalalithaa CMBT Metro to honor the former Chief Minister of Tamil Nadu J. Jayalalithaa, who inaugurated the Puratchi Thalaivar Dr. M.G.R Bus Terminus, Asia's biggest bus terminus and the metro station.

Construction history
The station was constructed by Consolidated Constructed Consortium (CCCL). The station attained structural completion in December 2012. The consolidated cost of the station along with the stations of Arumbakkam, Koyambedu, Vadapalani and Ashok Nagar was  1,395.4 million.

The station
The station is an elevated station within the bus terminus in front of the main facade. The station can handle about 23,000 passengers an hour.

Layout

Supportive infrastructure
The station lies within  from the Koyambedu Junction. At least three pedestrian underpass has been planned on Jawaharlal Nehru Road and Kaliamman Koil Street.

Commercial hub
The station is one of the five stations in the first phase of the Chennai Metro project identified to be converted into commercial hubs, the others being Arignar Anna Alandur, Arumbakkam, Ekkattuthangal, and Ashok Nagar. Two buildings are planned on either ends of the station depending on the availability of land.

See also

References

External links
 

 UrbanRail.Net – descriptions of all metro systems in the world, each with a schematic map showing all stations.

Chennai Metro stations
Railway stations in Chennai